Spanish-language literature or Hispanic literature is the sum of the literary works written in the Spanish language across the Hispanic world.  The principal elements are the Spanish literature of Spain, and Latin American literature.  There is also American literature in Spanish and Philippine literature in Spanish, as well as literature from some other parts of the world.

Nobelists
Eleven Spanish-language writers have won the Nobel Prize in Literature:
1904: José Echegaray, Spain
1922: Jacinto Benavente, Spain
1945: Gabriela Mistral, Chile
1956: Juan Ramón Jiménez, Spain
1967: Miguel Ángel Asturias, Guatemala
1971: Pablo Neruda, Chile
1977: Vicente Aleixandre, Spain
1982: Gabriel García Márquez, Colombia
1989: Camilo José Cela, Spain
1990: Octavio Paz, Mexico
2010: Mario Vargas Llosa, Peru

See also

List of Spanish-language authors
List of Spanish-language poets

References